The RZ.2 was a British design for a liquid oxygen (LOX) / kerosene-fuelled rocket engine to power the Blue Streak (missile).

The design was a development of the Rolls-Royce RZ.1 rocket engine, which had in turn been a development by Rolls-Royce of the Rocketdyne S-3D. Rolls-Royce, Ansty was the design authority.

The engines could be vectored by seven degrees in flight for guidance.

Some disconnected facts for arrangement:

The Efflux chamber of the engine was made of nickel tubes brazed together through which flowed kerosene down one tube and back up the adjacent tube via a manifold at the mouth of the chamber. After static firings, these chambers were checked by climbing inside the engine from beneath. In addition, during firing, the inside of the chamber became coated with fine carbon, making inspection a filthy procedure. However, the chamber required careful inspection because firing would occasionally create small holes in the walls.

At the head of the chamber was the injector plate with concentric circles of LOX and kerosene injectors arranged in such a way that the liquids jets hit one another, like on like. The outer ring, of kerosene injectors helped cool the tubes that formed the chamber walls.
The start sequence was as follows:
-10 secs The start tanks were pressurized.
-7.5 secs The blade valves opened to allow fuel and oxidant to flow to the gas generator and on to the pump turbines. These turbines accelerated from 0 to 30,000 rpm in 32 ms and drove pumps through a 6 to 1 reduction gearbox which forced the propellants into the engines.
-4 s main engine burn commenced.
-2.5 s Full thrust was achieved.
0 s Vehicle release.

Lift off was required to be at 1.3 g to enable the ground equipment to be cleared. Bearing in mind the nature of the autopilot the vehicle tended to rotate about its long axis and move laterally at release as a result of standing small corrections implemented through the vectoring of the engines.
Because of the limited gain change abilities of the autopilot, as the weight of the vehicle fell the corrections applied by vectoring the engines were more vigorous; at lighter weights and even on ground tests the engines were seen not to be entirely rigid as the mouth of the chamber moved slightly after the corrections were applied by the hydraulic rams.

Display examples 
 Alongside the Blue Streak at the National Space Centre in Leicester
 Armagh Planetarium
 The Euro Space Center in Redu, Belgium.
 Imperial War Museum Duxford, Cambridgeshire.
 The Woomera Missile Park in South Australia (recovered after flight)

References 

Rolls-Royce rocket engines
Rocket engines of the United Kingdom
Rocket engines using kerosene propellant
Rocket engines using the gas-generator cycle